BravinLee programs is a contemporary art gallery in the Chelsea neighborhood of New York City. The gallery's programs support the exhibition of works on paper, artist books, public art projects, and artist-designed hand-knotted rugs.

In 2006, the gallery organized a public art project called "Studio in the Park" that brought 11 site-specific artworks artworks to Riverside Park in upper Manhattan.

One of the gallery's programs involves working with artists who design limited edition hand-knotted rugs. Rugs have been designed by Nina Bovasso, James Siena, Peter Halley, Thomas Nozkowski, Jonathan Lasker and James Welling.

John Post Lee is the owner with Karin Bravin of BravinLee programs, a contemporary art gallery in Chelsea. The gallery opened in 1991. In 1994 the gallery moved to Mercer Street.

BravinLee programs opened in 2006 to represent artists and collaborate with colleagues and institutions on a project-by-project basis. The gallery also shows one of kind books, produces rug editions and curates public art installations. In 2006, the gallery organized Studio in The Park, an outdoor installation in Riverside Park and logistical assistance for Illumination, on the grounds of The Rothko Chapel. Since 2009 the gallery has worked with The Downtown Alliance of Manhattan as an adjunct curator producing public art projects for construction remediation. In the fall of 2011, the gallery will plan an exhibit on the grounds of Lehman College in the Bronx.

References

External links
 
 New York Times article on public art projects
 New York Times article on artist tapestries
 Douglas Florian New York Times review
 Seven Art Fair Miami Web Site

Art museums and galleries in Manhattan
Art galleries established in 1991
1991 establishments in New York City
Chelsea, Manhattan